Annette DeFoe (born Gertrude Marie Aucoin;  – August 6, 1960), also known as Annette De Foe, was an American silent screen actress, known for her work in early romantic comedies.

DeFoe acted in stock theater in New Orleans before going to Los Angeles to perform for the E & R Jungle Film Company. She debuted with that company in the farce Hitting the High Places. She also acted with the Kalem Company in Jacksonville, Florida. In the early 1902s, DeFoe had leading roles in films made by John M. Stahl and Louis B. Mayer.

DeFoe died on August 6, 1960, at age 71 at the Kaiser Foundation Hospital.

Filmography
One Clear Call (1922) - Yetta
Lone Hand Wilson (1920) - Lolita Hansen
Fame and Fortune (1918) - Mattie Carson
 Indiscreet Corinne (1917) - Florette
The Girl in the Garret (1917)
An Aerial Joy Ride (1917) - Daughter
The Red Stain (1917)
Social Pirates (1917)

References

External links

American stage actresses
American silent film actresses
American film actresses
Actresses from Ohio
1880s births
1960 deaths
20th-century American actresses